Dmytro Valeriyovych Mikhay (born 27 February 1990) is a Ukrainian rower.  He won the gold medal in the quadruple sculls at the 2014 World Rowing Championships in Amsterdam, with what is still a world's fastest time as of September 2018.

He competed in the double sculls at the 2012 Summer Olympics with Artem Morozov.  He won the gold medal in the quadruple sculls at the 2014 World Rowing Championships in Amsterdam with Morozov, Oleksandr Nadtoka and Ivan Dovhodko.  The team also won the European Championships that year.  The team of Mikhay, Morozov, Nadtoka and Dovhodko won the silver medal at the 2015 European Championships.

He competed at the 2016 Olympic Games in the men's quadruple sculls with Morozov, Oleksandr Nadtoka and Ivan Dovhodko.  In 2018, Mikhay, alongside Sergii Gryn, Nadtoka and Dovhodko won the bronze medal in the men's quadruple sculls at the World Championships.

Following the 2022 Russian invasion of Ukraine, Mikhay and his wife Dasha escaped to England, where they are living with the family of his friend, former rower Jack Beaumont, in Nettlebed, near Henley-on-Thames in Oxfordshire.

References

External links

1990 births
Living people
Ukrainian male rowers
Sportspeople from Kherson
Rowers at the 2012 Summer Olympics
Rowers at the 2016 Summer Olympics
Olympic rowers of Ukraine
World Rowing Championships medalists for Ukraine
Universiade silver medalists for Ukraine
Universiade medalists in rowing
Medalists at the 2013 Summer Universiade
Medalists at the 2015 Summer Universiade
Recipients of the Order of Danylo Halytsky